Samuel Burgess-Johnson is an English art director, graphic designer and photographer based in Los Angeles, known for working with musical artists such as The 1975, Tove Lo, Wolf Alice and No Rome.

Career 
Samuel Burgess-Johnson moved to Melbourne after finishing university and began working as an art director. He has worked with artists such as Usher, Wolf Alice, AlunaGeorge, Pale Waves and Coasts. He has also worked with brands such as Unilever and Nike, Inc.

He is the art director for English indie rock band The 1975, whose lead singer Matty Healy was his flatmate. He came up with the cover for their debut EP Facedown together with Healy. Burgess-Johnson introduced the Filipino music artist No Rome to Matty Healy of The 1975, who subsequently signed him to the label Dirty Hit.

Burgess-Johnson designed the cover art for The Franklin Electric's 2017 album Blue Ceilings. He was nominated for a Grammy Award for The 1975's album I Like It When You Sleep, for You Are So Beautiful yet So Unaware of It.

In 2018, Burgess-Johnson relocated from Dalston to Los Angeles where he produced cover art for bands such as Thirty Seconds to Mars, Ta-ku, and Wafia.

He contributed to the music video for Porter Robinson's 2020 single "Get Your Wish".

References

External links 
 Official website

Album-cover and concert-poster artists
Artists from London
Advertising artists and illustrators
Photographers from London
Living people
Year of birth missing (living people)
English graphic designers